The 2019 Seattle Mariners season was the 43rd season in franchise history. The Mariners played their twentieth full season and twenty-first overall at T-Mobile Park, their home ballpark. The Mariners entered the season with the longest active playoff drought in the four major North American professional sports and again failed to make their first postseason appearance since 2001. The Mariners started the season with a 13–2 record, their best start in franchise history. However, they went 55–92 after their great start, finishing last in the AL West for the first time since 2012 and falling out of the playoffs once again.

With the Washington Nationals winning the World Series during the 2019 postseason, the Mariners now hold the dubious distinction of being the only MLB franchise to have never played in the World Series.

Ichiro Suzuki played his final MLB game in the second game of the season.

Standings

American League West

Record against opponents

Regular season

Game log

|-style=background:#bfb
| 1 || March 20 @Tokyo Dome || @ Athletics || 9–7 || Gonzales (1–0) || Fiers (0–1) || Strickland (1) || 45,787 || 1–0 || W1 
|-style=background:#bfb
| 2 || March 21 @Tokyo Dome || @ Athletics || 5–4 (12) || Rosscup (1–0) || Buchter (0–1) || Strickland (2) || 46,451 || 2–0 || W2
|-style=background:#bfb
| 3 || March 28 || Red Sox || 12–4 || Gonzales (2–0) || Sale (0–1) || — || 45,601 || 3–0 || W3
|-style=background:#fbb
| 4 || March 29 || Red Sox || 6–7 || Johnson (1–0) || Strickland (0–1) || Barnes (1) || 29,002 || 3–1 || L1
|-style=background:#bfb
| 5 || March 30 || Red Sox || 6–5 || Leake (1–0) || Rodríguez (0–1) || Rumbelow (1) || 34,928 || 4–1 || W1
|-style=background:#bfb
| 6 || March 31 || Red Sox || 10–8 || LeBlanc (1–0) || Porcello (0–1) || Bradford (1) || 33,391 || 5–1 || W2
|-

|-style=background:#bfb
||7|| April 1 || Angels || 6–3 || Hernández (1–0) || Stratton (0–1) || Elías (1) || 14,463 || 6–1 || W3 
|-style=background:#bfb
||8|| April 2 || Angels || 2–1 || Gonzales (3–0) || García (0–1) || Swarzak (1) || 13,567 || 7–1 || W4 
|-style=background:#bbb
|| – || April 4 || @ White Sox || Colspan=7| Postponed (inclement weather); Rescheduled for April 5th.
|-style=background:#fbb
||9|| April 5 || @ White Sox || 8–10 || Burr (1–0) || Gearrin (0–1) || Colomé (2) || 32,723 || 7–2 || L1
|-style=background:#bfb
||10|| April 6 || @ White Sox || 9–2 || Leake (2–0) || Giolito (1–1) || — || 31,286 || 8–2 || W1 
|-style=background:#bfb
||11|| April 7 || @ White Sox || 12–5 || LeBlanc (2–0) || Nova (0–1) || — || 12,509 || 9–2 || W2 
|-style=background:#bfb
||12|| April 8 || @ Royals || 13–5 || Elías (1–0) || Bailey (0–1) || — || 10,259 || 10–2 || W3
|-style=background:#bfb
||13|| April 9 || @ Royals || 6–3 || Gonzales (4–0) || Junis (1–1) || Swarzak (2) || 10,366 || 11–2 || W4 
|-style=background:#bfb
||14|| April 10 || @ Royals || 6–5 || Swarzak (1–0) || Boxberger (0–2) || Elías (2) || 12,775 || 12–2 || W5 
|-style=background:#bfb
||15|| April 11 || @ Royals || 7–6 (10) || Brennan (1–0) || Sparkman (0–1) || Sadzeck (1) || 10,231 || 13–2 || W6 
|- style=background:#fbb
||16|| April 12 || Astros || 6–10 || Peacock (2–0) || Armstrong (0–1) || Osuna (5) || 30,969 || 13–3 || L1
|- style="text-align:center; background:#fbb
||17|| April 13 || Astros || 1–3 || Verlander (2–0) || Hernández (1–1)|| Osuna (6) || 30,533 || 13–4 || L2
|-style=background:#fbb
||18|| April 14 || Astros || 2–3 || Cole (1–2) ||Brennan (0–1) || Osuna (7) || 29,237 || 13–5 || L3
|-style=background:#fbb
||19|| April 15 || Indians || 4–6 || Bauer (2–1) || Kikuchi (0–1) || Hand (5) || 11,214 || 13–6 || L4
|-style=background:#fbb
||20|| April 16 || Indians || 2–4 || Bieber (2–0) || Leake (2–1) || Hand (6) || 11,826 || 13–7 || L5
|-style=background:#fbb
||21|| April 17 || Indians || 0–1 || Carrasco (2–2) || Swanson (0–1) || Wittgren (1) || 13,325 || 13–8 || L6
|-style=background:#bfb
||22|| April 18 || @ Angels || 11–10 || Swarzak (2–0) || Allen (0–1) || Elias (3) || 33,592 || 14–8 || W1
|-style=background:#bfb
||23|| April 19 || @ Angels || 5–3 || Rosscup (2–0) || Allen (0–2) || Elias (4) || 41,021 || 15–8 || W2
|-style=background:#bfb
||24|| April 20 || @ Angels || 6–5 || Kikuchi (1–1) || Cahill (1–2) || Swarzak (3) || 41,147 || 16–8 || W3
|-style=background:#fbb
||25|| April 21 || @ Angels || 6–8 || Barria (2–1) || Leake (2–2) || García (1) || 34,155 || 16–9 || L1 
|-style=background:#fbb
||26|| April 23 || @ Padres || 3–6 || Margevicius (2–2) || Swanson (0–2) || Yates (11) || 25,154 || 16–10 || L2
|-style=background:#fbb
||27|| April 24 || @ Padres || 0–1 || Paddack (1–1) || Hernández (1–2) || Yates (12) || 23,417 || 16–11 || L3 
|-style=background:#bfb
||28|| April 25 || Rangers || 14–2 || Gonzales (5–0) || Hearn (0–1) || — || 12,644 || 17–11 || W1
|-style=background:#bfb
||29|| April 26 || Rangers || 5–4 (11) || Elias (2–0) || Dowdy (1–1) || — || 21,721 || 18–11 || W2
|-style=background:#fbb
||30|| April 27 || Rangers || 1–15 || Minor (3–2) || Leake (2–3) || — || 26,493 || 18–12 || L1
|-style=background:#fbb
||31|| April 28 || Rangers || 1–14 || Lynn (3–2) || Swanson (0–3) || — || 21,503 || 18–13 || L2
|-style=background:#fbb
||32|| April 30 || Cubs || 5–6 || Brach (3–0)|| Brennan (1–1) || Cishek (1) || 27,545 || 18–14 || L3
|-

|-style=background:#fbb
||33|| May 1 || Cubs || 0–11 || Lester (2–1) || Gonzales (5–1) || — || 29,471 || 18–15 || L4
|-style=background:#fbb
||34|| May 3 || @ Indians || 1–2 || Hand (1–1) || Swarzak (2–1) || — || 16,334 || 18–16 || L5
|-style=background:#fbb
||35|| May 4 || @ Indians || 4–5 || Olson (1–0) || Sadzeck (0–1) || Hand (10) || 18.420 || 18–17 || L6
|-style=background:#bfb
||36|| May 5 || @ Indians || 10–0 || Swanson (1–3) || Anderson (0–1) || — || 19,665 || 19–17 || W1
|-style=background:#fbb
||37|| May 6 || @ Yankees || 3–7 || Sabathia (2–1) || Hernández (1–3) || — || 37,423 || 19–18 || L1
|-style=background:#fbb
||38|| May 7 || @ Yankees || 4–5 || Harvey (1–0) || Swarzak (2–2) || — || 36,851 || 19–19 || L2
|-style=background:#bfb
||39|| May 8 || @ Yankees || 10–1 || Kikuchi (2–1) || Loáisiga (1–1) || — || 38,774 || 20–19 || W1
|-style=background:#fbb
||40|| May 9 || @ Yankees || 1–3 || Happ (2–3) || Leake (2–4) || Chapman (8) || 37,016 || 20–20 || L1 
|-style=background:#fbb
||41|| May 10 || @ Red Sox || 1–14 || Rodríguez (4–2) || Swanson (1–4) || — || 33,731 || 20–21 || L2
|-style=background:#fbb
||42|| May 11 || @ Red Sox || 5–9 || Porcello (3–3) || Hernández (1–4) || — || 36,024 || 20–22 || L3
|-style=background:#fbb
||43|| May 12 || @ Red Sox || 2–11 || Velázquez (1–2) || Gonzales (5–2) || — || 33,069 || 20–23 || L4
|-style=background:#bfb
||44|| May 13 || Athletics || 6–5 (10) || Brennan (2–2) || Soria (1–3) || — || 12,250 || 21–23 || W1
|-style=background:#bfb
||45|| May 14 || Athletics || 4–3 || Leake (3–4) || Anderson (4–3) || Elias (5) || 11,365 || 22–23 || W2
|-style=background:#fbb
||46|| May 16 || Twins || 6–11 || Pineda (3–3) || Swanson (1–5) || — || 16,397 || 22–24 || L1
|-style=background:#fbb
||47|| May 17 || Twins || 1–7 || Pérez (6–1) || Gonzales (5–3) || — || 20,268 || 22–25 || L2
|-style=background:#fbb
||48|| May 18 || Twins || 4–18 || Duffey (1–0) || LeBlanc (2–1) || — || 34,433 || 22–26 || L3
|-style=background:#bfb
||49|| May 19 || Twins || 7–4 || Kikuchi (3–1) || Gibson (4–2)|| — || 31,068 || 23–26 || W1
|-style=background:#fbb
||50|| May 20 || @ Rangers || 9–10 || Minor (5-3) || Leake (3-5) || — || 18,796 || 23–27 || L1
|-style=background:#fbb
||51|| May 21 || @ Rangers || 3–5 || Lynn (6–3) || Milone (0–1) || Kelley (3) || 19,157 || 23–28 || L2 
|-style=background:#fbb
||52|| May 22 || @ Rangers || 1–2 || Sampson (2-3) || Gonzales (5-4) || Kelley (4) || 22,400 || 23–29 || L3
|-style=background:#fbb
||53|| May 24 || @ Athletics || 2–6 || Trivino (2-0) || LeBlanc (2-2) || — || 12,902 || 23–30 || L4
|-style=background:#fbb
||54|| May 25 || @ Athletics || 5–6 || Fiers (4–3) || Kikuchi (3–2) || Treinen (10) || 18,975 || 23–31 || L5
|-style=background:#fbb
||55|| May 26 || @ Athletics || 1–7 || Anderson (6–3) || Leake (3-6) || — || 14,664 || 23–32 || L6
|-style=background:#bfb
||56|| May 27 || Rangers || 6–2 || Milone (1–1) || Lynn (6–4) || — || 14,135 || 24–32 || W1
|-style=background:#fbb
||57|| May 28 || Rangers || 4–11 || Sampson (3-3) || Gonzales (5-5) || — || 12,452 || 24–33 || L1
|-style=background:#fbb
||58|| May 29 || Rangers || 7–8 || Chavez (1–1) || Bass (0–1) || Kelley (6) || 16,059 || 24–34 || L2
|-style=background:#fbb
||59|| May 30 || Angels || 3–9 || Peña (3–1) || Kikuchi (3–3) || — || 13,972 || 24–35 || L3
|-style=background:#bfb
||60|| May 31 || Angels || 4–3 || Leake (4-6) || Skaggs (4–5) || Bass (1) || 32,164 || 25–35 || W1
|-

|-style=background:#fbb
||61|| June 1 || Angels || 3–6 || Bedrosian (2–3) || Brennan (2–3) || Robles (7) || 28,128 || 25–36 || L1
|-style=background:#fbb
||62|| June 2 || Angels || 3–13 || Suárez (1–0) || Gonzales (5–6) || — || 28,912 || 25–37 || L2
|-style=background:#fbb
||63|| June 3 || Astros || 2–4 || Valdez (3–2) || Gearrin (0–2) || Pressly (3) || 11,825 || 25–38 || L3
|-style=background:#fbb
||64|| June 4 || Astros || 5–11 || Guduan (1–0) || Brennan (2–4) || — || 12,208 || 25–39 || L4
|-style=background:#bfb
||65|| June 5 || Astros || 14–1 || Leake (5–6) || Peacock (5–3) || — || 13,652 || 26–39 || W1
|-style=background:#fbb
||66|| June 6 || Astros || 7–8 (14) || Devenski (1–0) || Festa (0–1) || — || 20,258 || 26–40 || L1
|-style=background:#bfb
||67|| June 7 || @ Angels || 6–2 || Gonzales (6–6) || Heaney (0–1) || — || 41,495 || 27–40 || W1
|-style=background:#fbb
||68|| June 8 || @ Angels || 3–12 || Peters (1–0) || Kikuchi (3–4) || — || 40,569 || 27–41 || L1
|-style=background:#bfb
||69|| June 9 || @ Angels || 9–3 || LeBlanc (3–2) || Suárez (1–1) || — || 41,614 || 28–41 || W1
|-style=background:#fbb
||70|| June 11 || @ Twins || 5–6 || Magill (2–0) || Brennan (2–5) || May (2) || 23,046 || 28–42 || L1
|-style=background:#bfb
||71|| June 12 || @ Twins || 9–6 (10) || Bass (1–1) || Duffey (1–1) || Elías (6) || 25,909 || 29–42 || W1
|-style=background:#fbb
||72|| June 13 || @ Twins || 5–10 || Harper (2–0) || Brennan (2–6) || — || 31,912 || 29–43 || L1
|-style=background:#bfb
||73|| June 14 || @ Athletics || 9–2 || Gonzales (7–6) || Bassitt (3–3) || — || 21,387 || 30–43 || W1
|-style=background:#fbb
||74|| June 15 || @ Athletics || 2–11 || Montas (9–2) || Bautista (0–1) || — || 14,846 || 30–44 || L1
|-style=background:#bfb
||75|| June 16 || @ Athletics || 6–3 || Leake (6–6) || Trivino (2–5) || Elías (7) || 30,242 || 31–44 || W1
|-style=background:#fbb
||76|| June 17 || Royals || 4–6 || Flynn (1–0) || Bass (1–2) || Kennedy (8) || 14,476 || 31–45 || L1
|-style=background:#fbb
||77|| June 18 || Royals || 0–9 || Bailey (6–6) || Kikuchi (3–5) || — || 12,697 || 31–46 || L2
|-style=background:#bfb
||78|| June 19 || Royals || 8–2 || Gonzales (8–6) || Keller (3–9) || — || 16,228 || 32–46 || W1
|-style=background:#bfb
||79|| June 20 || Orioles || 5–2 || LeBlanc (4–2) || Bundy (3–9) || Elías (8) || 15,217 || 33–46 || W2
|-style=background:#bfb
||80|| June 21 || Orioles || 10–9 || Leake (7–6) || Gilmartin (0–1) || Elías (9) || 23,281 || 34–46 || W3
|-style=background:#fbb
||81|| June 22 || Orioles || 4–8 || Cashner (7–3) || Milone (1–2) || — || 27,545 || 34–47 || L1
|-style=background:#bfb
||82|| June 23 || Orioles || 13–3 || Kikuchi (4–5) || Ynoa (0–5) || — || 23,920 || 35–47 || W1
|-style=background:#bfb
||83|| June 25 || @ Brewers || 8–3 || Gonzales (9–6) || Davies (7–2) || — || 28,468 || 36–47 || W2
|-style=background:#bfb
||84|| June 26 || @ Brewers || 4–2 || LeBlanc (5–2) || Houser (2–2) || Elías (10) || 30,074 || 37–47 || W3
|-style=background:#fbb
||85|| June 27 || @ Brewers || 2–4 || Anderson (4–2) || Leake (6–7) || Hader (19) || 36,587 || 37–48 || L1
|-style=background:#fbb
||86|| June 28 || @ Astros || 1–2  || Harris (2–1) || Festa (0–2) || — || 32,828 || 37–49 || L2
|-style=background:#fbb
||87|| June 29 || @ Astros || 5–6  || Devenski (2–0) || Elías (2–1) || — || 35,082 || 37–50 || L3
|-style=background:#fbb
||88|| June 30 || @ Astros || 1–6 || Cole (8–5) || Gonzales (9–7) || — || 32,485 || 37–51 || L4
|-

|-style=background:#bfb
||89|| July 2 || Cardinals || 5–4 || Adams (1–0) || Gallegos (1–1) || Elías (11) || 20,173 || 38–51 || W1
|-style=background:#fbb
||90|| July 3 || Cardinals || 2–5 || Brebbia (2–3) || Adams (1–1) || — || 31,878 || 38–52 || L1
|-style=background:#fbb
||91|| July 4 || Cardinals || 4–5 || Ponce de Leon (1–0) || Milone (1–3) || Martinez (3) || 26,656 || 38–53 || L2
|-style=background:#fbb
||92|| July 5 || Athletics || 2–5 || Anderson (9–5) || Kikuchi (4–6) || Hendriks (4) || 19,712 || 38–54 || L3
|-style=background:#bfb
||93|| July 6 || Athletics || 6–3 || Gonzales (10–7) || Bassitt (5–4) || — || 24,298 || 39–54 || W1
|-style=background:#fbb
||94|| July 7 || Athletics || 4–7 || Mengden (4–1) || Carasiti (0–1) || Hendriks (5) || 25,816 || 39–55 || L1
|-style=background:#bbbfff
||-|| July 9 || colspan="8"|90th All-Star Game in Cleveland, OH
|-style=background:#fbb
||95|| July 12 || @ Angels || 0–13 || Peña (7–2) || Leake (7–8) || — || 43,140 || 39–56 || L2
|-style=background:#fbb
||96|| July 13 || @ Angels || 2–9 || Harvey (3–4) || LeBlanc (5–3) || — || 41,549 || 39–57 || L3
|-style=background:#fbb
||97|| July 14 || @ Angels || 3–6 || Buttrey (5–4) || Bass (1–3) || Robles (13) || 38,560 || 39–58 || L4
|-style=background:#fbb
||98|| July 16 || @ Athletics || 2–9 || Mengden (5–1) || Gonzales (10–8) || — || 18,718 || 39–59 || L5
|-style=background:#fbb
||99|| July 17 || @ Athletics || 2–10 || Bailey (8–6) || Milone (1–4) || — || 19,161 || 39–60 || L6
|-style=background:#bfb
||100|| July 19 || Angels || 10–0 || Leake (8–8) || Barría (3–3) || — || 19,976 || 40–60 || W1
|-style=background:#fbb
||101|| July 20 || Angels || 2–6 || Buttrey (6–4) || Elías (2–2) || — || 30,927 || 40–61 || L1
|-style=background:#fbb
||102|| July 21 || Angels || 3–9 || Peters (2–0) || Kikuchi (4–7) || — || 24,767 || 40-62 || L2
|-style=background:#bfb
||103|| July 22 || Rangers || 7–3 || Gonzales (11–8) || Sampson (6–7) || Elías (12) || 16,091 || 41–62 || W1
|-style=background:#fbb
||104|| July 23 || Rangers || 2–7 || Payano (1–0) ||  Milone (1–5) || — || 15,543 || 41–63 || L1
|-style=background:#bfb
||105|| July 24 || Rangers || 5–3 || Leake (9–8) || Minor (8–6) || Elías (13) || 28,163 || 42–63 || W1
|-style=background:#bfb
||106|| July 25 || Tigers || 10–2 || LeBlanc (6–3) || VerHagen (1–1) || — || 18,544 || 43–63 || W2
|-style=background:#bfb
||107|| July 26 || Tigers || 3–2 || Elías (3–2) || Cisnero (0–1) || — || 26,702 || 44–63 || W3
|-style=background:#bfb
||108|| July 27 || Tigers || 8–1 || Gonzales (12–8) || Alexander (0–1) || — || 27,140 || 45–63 || W4
|-style=background:#bfb
||109|| July 28 || Tigers || 3–2 (10) || Elías (4–2) || Cisnero (0–2) || — || 20,024 || 46–63 || W5
|-style=background:#bfb
||110|| July 30 || @ Rangers || 8–5 || Tuivailala (1–0) || Martin (1–2) || Elías (14) || 20,599 || 47–63 || W6
|-style=background:#fbb
||111|| July 31 || @ Rangers || 7–9 || Minor (9–6) || LeBlanc (6–4) || Chavez (1) || 22,539 || 47–64 || L1
|-

|-style=background:#fbb
||112|| August 2 || @ Astros || 2–10 || Miley (10–4) || Kikuchi (4–8) || — || 41,444 || 47–65 || L2
|-style=background:#fbb
||113|| August 3 || @ Astros || 0–9 || Sanchez (4–14) || Gonzales (12–9) || — || 37,059 || 47–66 || L3
|-style=background:#fbb
||114|| August 4 || @ Astros || 1–3 || Verlander (15–4) || Milone (1–6) || Osuna (25) || 39,667 || 47–67 || L4
|-style=background:#fbb
||115|| August 6 || Padres || 4–9 || Lamet (1–2) || LeBlanc (6–5) || — || 24,020 || 47–68 || L5
|-style=background:#bfb
||116|| August 7 || Padres || 3–2 || Magill (3–0) || Muñoz (0–1) || Bass (2) || 20,142 || 48–68 || W1
|-style=background:#fbb
||117|| August 9 || Rays || 3–5 || Drake (1–1) || Bass (1–4) || Pagán (10) || 26,774 || 48–69 || L1
|-style=background:#fbb
||118|| August 10 || Rays || 4–5 || Morton (13–4) || Milone (1–7) || Pagán (11) || 33,895 || 48–70 || L2
|-style=background:#fbb
||119|| August 11 || Rays || 0–1 || Yarbrough (11–3) || LeBlanc (6–6) || Pagán (12) || 24,219 || 48–71 || L3
|-style=background:#bfb
||120|| August 13 || @ Tigers || 11–6 || Grotz (1–0) || Boyd (6–9) || — || 16,195 || 49–71 || W1
|-style=background:#fbb
||121|| August 14 || @ Tigers || 3–2 || Jackson (3–5) || Gonzales (12–10) || Jiménez (2) || 17,132 || 49–72 || L1
|-style=background:#bfb
||122|| August 15 || @ Tigers || 7–2 || Milone (2–7) || Turnbull (3–11) || || 19,440 || 50–72 || W1
|-style=background:#fbb
||123|| August 16 || @ Blue Jays || 3–7 || Waguespack (4–1) || LeBlanc (6–7) || — || 20,844 || 50–73 || L1
|-style=background:#bfb
||124|| August 17 || @ Blue Jays || 4–3 || Bass (2–4) || Mayza (1–2) || Magill (1) || 22,073 || 51–73 || W1
|-style=background:#bfb
||125|| August 18 || @ Blue Jays || 7–0 || Kikuchi (5–8) || Font (3–3) || — || 23,604 || 52–73 || W2
|-style=background:#bfb
||126|| August 19 || @ Rays || 9–3 || Gonzales (13–10) || McKay (2–3) || — || 9,152 || 53–73 || W3
|-style=background:#bfb
||127|| August 20 || @ Rays || 7–4 || Milone (3–7) || Beeks (5–3) || Magill (2) || 7,455 || 54–73 || W4
|-style=background:#fbb
||128|| August 21 || @ Rays || 6–7 || Pagán (3–2) || Magill (3–1) || — || 7,827 || 54–74 || L1
|-style=background:#bfb
||129|| August 23 || Blue Jays || 7–4 || Wisler (3–2) || Gaviglio (4–2) || Magill (3) || 34,706 || 55–74 || W1
|-style=background:#fbb
||130|| August 24 || Blue Jays || 5–7 || Stewart (3–0) || McClain (0–1) || Law (4) || 34,590 || 55–75 || L1
|-style=background:#bfb
||131|| August 25 || Blue Jays || 3–1 || Gonzales (14–10) || Buchholz (0–3) || Magill (4) || 29,698 || 56–75 || W1
|-style=background:#fbb
||132|| August 26 || Yankees || 4–5 || Happ (11–8) || Milone (3–8) || Chapman (36) || 23,030 || 56–76 || L1
|-style=background:#fbb
||133|| August 27 || Yankees || 0–7 || Tanaka (10–7) ||  Kikuchi (5–9) || — || 23,129 || 56–77 || L2
|-style=background:#fbb
||134|| August 28 || Yankees || 3–7 || Paxton (11–6) || Sheffield (0–1) || — || 32,013 || 56–78 || L3
|-style=background:#bfb
||135|| August 29 || @ Rangers || 5–3 || Magill (4–1) || Leclerc (2–4) || — || 16,591 || 57–78 || W1
|-style=background:#fbb
||136|| August 30 || @ Rangers || 3–6 || Allard (3–0) || Gonzales (14–11) || Clase (1) || 23,563 || 57–79 || L1
|-style=background:#fbb
||137|| August 31 || @ Rangers || 2–3 || Clase (2–2) || Magill (4–2) || — || 	33,668 || 57–80 || L2
|-

|-style=background:#bfb
||138|| September 1 || @ Rangers || 11–3 || Kikuchi (6–9) || Martin (1–3) || — || 22,116 || 58–80 || W1
|-style=background:#fbb
||139|| September 2 || @ Cubs || 1–5 || Phelps (2–0) || Wisler (3–3) || — || 39,133 || 58–81 || L1
|-style=background:#fbb
||140|| September 3 || @ Cubs || 1–6 || Lester (12–9) || Hernández (1–5) || — || 33,958 || 58–82 || L2
|-style=background:#fbb
||141|| September 5 || @ Astros || 9–11  || James (5–0) || Wisler (3–4) || — || 27,822 || 58–83 || L3
|-style=background:#fbb
||142|| September 6 || @ Astros || 4–7 || Smith (1–0) || Milone (3–9) || Osuna (32) || 33,149 || 58–84 || L4
|-style=background:#fbb
||143|| September 7 || @ Astros || 1–2 || Verlander (18–5) || Adams (1–2) || Harris (2) || 41,938 || 58–85 || L5
|-style=background:#fbb
||144|| September 8 || @ Astros || 1–21 || Cole (16–5) || Hernández (1–6) || — || 35,569 || 58–86 || L6
|-style=background:#bfb
||145|| September 10 || Reds || 4–3 || Altavilla (1–0) || Garrett (4–3) || Bass (3) || 12,230 || 59–86 || W1
|-style=background:#bfb
||146|| September 11 || Reds || 5–3 || Gonzales (15–11) || Gray (10–7) || Bass (4) || 10,152 || 60–86 || W2
|-style=background:#fbb
||147|| September 12 || Reds || 5–11 || Romano (1–0) || Altavilla (1–1) || — || 15,564 || 60–87 || L1
|-style=background:#fbb
||148|| September 13 || White Sox || 7–9 || Osich (3–0) || Kikuchi (6–10) || Colomé (27) || 17,255 || 60–88 || L2
|-style=background:#bfb
||149|| September 14 || White Sox || 2–1  || Magill (5–2) || Colomé (4–4) || — || 26,063 || 61–88 || W1
|-style=background:#bfb
||150|| September 15 || White Sox || 11–10 || Adams (2–2) || Ruiz (1–3) || — || 17,091 || 62–88 || W2
|-style=background:#bfb
||151|| September 17 || @ Pirates || 6–0 || Gonzales (16–11) || Keller (1–5) || — || 10,933 || 63–88 || W3
|-style=background:#bfb
||152|| September 18 || @ Pirates || 4–1 || Milone (5–9) || Agrazal (4–5) || Magill (5) || 9,875 || 64–88 || W4
|-style=background:#bfb
||153|| September 19 || @ Pirates || 6–5  || Brennan (3–6) || Holmes (1–2) || Swanson (1) || 12,543 || 65–88 || W5
|-style=background:#fbb
||154|| September 20 || @ Orioles || 3–5 || Brooks (6–8) || Hernández (1–7) || — || 11,719 || 65–89 || L1
|-style=background:#bfb
||155|| September 21 || @ Orioles || 7–6  || Altavilla (2–1) || Scott (1–1) || Swanson (2) || 22,566 || 66–89 || W1
|-style=background:#fbb
||156|| September 22 || @ Orioles || 1–2 || Means (11–11) || Gonzales (16–12) || Bleier (4) || 17,540 || 66–90 || L1
|-style=background:#fbb
||157|| September 24 || Astros || 0–3 || Cole (19–5) || Milone (4–10) || Osuna (37) || 11,259 || 66–91 || L2
|-style=background:#fbb
||158|| September 25 || Astros || 0–3 || Greinke (18–5) || Kikuchi (6–11) || Harris (3) || 10,916 || 66–92 || L3
|-style=background:#fbb
||159|| September 26 || Athletics || 1–3 || Manaea (4–0) || Hernández (1–8) || Hendriks (25) || 20,907 || 66–93 || L4
|-style=background:#bfb
||160|| September 27 || Athletics || 4–3 || Warren (1–0) || Hendriks (4–4) || — || 24,092 || 67–93 || W1
|-style=background:#fbb
||161|| September 28 || Athletics || 0–1 || Anderson (13–9) || Gonzales (16–13) || Luzardo (2) || 26,401 || 67–94 || L1
|-style=background:#bfb
||162|| September 29 || Athletics || 3–1 || McClain (1–1) || Roark (10–10) || Bass (5) || 16,851 || 68–94 || W1
|-

|- style="text-align:center;"
| Legend:       = Win       = Loss  &;    = PostponementBold = Mariners team member

Roster

Farm system

References

External links
Seattle Mariners Official Site 
2019 Seattle Mariners season at Baseball Reference

Seattle Mariners seasons
Seattle Mariners season
Seattle Mariners
Seattle Mariners